The Arendt Jensen House, at 1431 Ezell St. in Gardnerville, Nevada, is a historic foursquare house—in this case termed a "Denver Square" form—that was built in 1910.  It was a home of Danish immigrant Arendt Jensen, a merchant who became prominent in Gardnersville.
Also known as the Reid Mansion, it includes Colonial Revival-style ornamentation.  It was listed on the National Register of Historic Places in 1989; the listing included two contributing buildings:  the second is an accompanying garage.

It was deemed significant for being "unique in the town of Gardnerville, Nevada in its scale and architectural sophistication";  it has been identified to be "one of Gardnerville's 'most outstanding buildings' in a comprehensive architectural survey of the Carson Valley conducted by the Douglas County Planning Department
in 1981."

See also 
Arendt Jensen Jr. House, also NRHP-listed in Gardnerville

References 

Colonial Revival architecture in Nevada
Houses completed in 1910
Houses on the National Register of Historic Places in Nevada
National Register of Historic Places in Douglas County, Nevada
Houses in Douglas County, Nevada
1910 establishments in Nevada